Tortulosa is a genus of air-breathing land snails, terrestrial pulmonate gastropod mollusks in the family Pupinidae. 

These snails are restricted to Western Ghats of India and Sri Lanka.

34 species are recognized.

Species
 Tortulosa albescens (Blanford, 1880)
 Tortulosa aurea (Pfeiffer 1855)
 Tortulosa austeniana (Benson 1853)
 Tortulosa barnaclei Tomlin 1928
 Tortulosa blanfordi (Dohrn, 1862)
 Tortulosa calcadensis (Blanford, 1869)
 Tortulosa colletti (Sykes, 1898)
 Tortulosa congener (Sykes, 1905)
 Tortulosa connectens (Fulton, 1903)
 Tortulosa costulata (Blanford, 1880)
 Tortulosa cumingi (Pfeiffer 1855)
 Tortulosa decora (Benson, 1853) 
 Tortulosa duplicate (Pfeiffer 1855)
 Tortulosa eurytrema (Pfeiffer 1855)
 Tortulosa greeni (Sykes, 1899)
 Tortulosa haemastoma (Pfeiffer 1855)
 Tortulosa hartleyi Tomlin 1928
 Tortulosa layardi (Pfeiffer 1855)
 Tortulosa leucocheilus (A. Adams & Sowerby, 1866)
 Tortulosa marginata (Pfeiffer 1855)
 Tortulosa naggsi Raheem & S. Schneider, 2017 - extinct
 Tortulosa nevilli (Sykes, 1898)
 Tortulosa nietneri (Nevill, 1871)
 Tortulosa presoni (Sykes, 1905)
 Tortulosa pyramidata (Pfeiffer 1855)
 Tortulosa recurvata (Pfeiffer, 1862)
 Tortulosa rugosa (Fulton, 1903)
 Tortulosa smithi (Sykes, 1905)
 Tortulosa sykesi (Fulton, 1903)
 Tortulosa templemani (Pfeiffer 1855)
 Tortulosa thwaitesi (Pfeiffer 1855)
 Tortulosa tortuosa (Gray, 1825)
Synonyms
 Tortulosa huberi Thach, 2018: synonym of Tortulosa tortuosa (Gray, 1825) (junior subjective synonym)
 Tortulosa schileykoi Thach & F. Huber, 2018: synonym of Tortulosa tortuosa (Gray, 1825) (junior subjective synonym)

References

 Tomlin, J. R. le B. (1948). New Malay land-shells. Proceedings of the Malacological Society of London. 27: 224-225, 1 plate.

External links
 Gray, J. E. (1847). A list of the genera of recent Mollusca, their synonyma and types. Proceedings of the Zoological Society of London. (1847) 15: 129-219
 Pfeiffer, L. (1851-1852). Conspectus Cyclostomaceorum. Zeitschrift für Malakozoologie. 8(10): 145–160 [December 1851; 8(11): 161–176]
 Kobelt W. (1902). Das Tierreich. Eine Zusammenstellung und Kennzeichnung der rezenten Tierformen. 16. Lieferung. Mollusca. Cyclophoridae. Das Tierreich. XXXIX + 662 pp., 1 map